Žitomir is a village in Zagreb County, Croatia. Administratively, it is a part of the township of Sveti Ivan Zelina.

References

Populated places in Zagreb County